This list contains people associated with the Eastern Florida State College, or formerly the Brevard Community College in Brevard County, Florida, including current and former college presidents, as well as notable alumni and faculty.

Alumni 

 Eli Abaev (born 1998), American-Israeli basketball player for Hapoel Be'er Sheva in the Israeli Basketball Premier League

Notable faculty and staff
Gaëtan Brulotte, Canadian writer
Lela E. Buis, US writer, poet and painter
Patrick D. Smith, US novelist

Presidents
 J. Bruce Wilson, 1960–1966
 Leo C. Muller, 1966–1968
 Maxwell King, 1968–1998
 Michael Kaliszeski (Interim), 1998
 Thomas E. Gamble, 1999–2006
 Jim Drake, 2006–2011
 Jim Richey, 2011–present

References

Eastern Florida State College
Eastern Florida State College people